Zanuck is a surname. Notable people with the surname include:

Darryl F. Zanuck (1902–1979), American film producer and studio executive
Dean Zanuck (born 1972), American film producer
Lili Fini Zanuck (born 1954), American film producer and director
Richard D. Zanuck (1934–2012), American film producer